The Indian Ambassador to France is the chief diplomatic representative of India to France, housed in the Embassy of India, Paris. The current ambassador is Jawed Ashraf. who succeeded Vinay Mohan Kwatra in August, 2020 following Kwatra's appointment as Indian ambassador to Nepal.

List of Indian Ambassadors to France
The following persons have served as the Ambassador of India to France and Principality of Monaco.

See also
 List of ambassadors of India to the United States

References

 
India
France